Brent Severyn (born February 22, 1966) is a Canadian former professional ice hockey defenseman who played in the National Hockey League (NHL).

Playing career
Severyn was drafted 99th overall by the Winnipeg Jets in the 1984 NHL Entry Draft and played for the Quebec Nordiques, Florida Panthers, New York Islanders, Colorado Avalanche, Mighty Ducks of Anaheim and the Dallas Stars. Severyn's primary role with each of his teams was to be an enforcer. He finished his career with 10 goals, 30 assists, and 815 Penalty Minutes (PIM) in 328 regular season games. Severyn participated in the only NHL fight to have occurred in Japan. He was a member of the Stanley Cup-winning Dallas Stars in 1999. He had a two-year spell in the Deutsche Eishockey Liga in Germany with the Munich Barons and the Krefeld Pinguine before retiring in 2001.

Personal life
Severyn works as a studio analyst for the Dallas Stars on Bally Sports Southwest. He is also a former radio color analyst for the Anaheim Ducks.

Career statistics

Transactions
 June 3, 1991 – Traded from Quebec to New Jersey for Dave Marcinyshyn
 September 30, 1993 – Traded from New Jersey to Winnipeg for conditional draft pick
 October 3, 1993 – Traded from Winnipeg to Florida for Milan Tichy
 September 4, 1996 – Traded from New York Islanders to Colorado for 3rd round draft pick in 1997 draft (Francis Lessard)

References

External links 

An enforcer's life is a daily battle by Brent Severyn

1966 births
Alberta Golden Bears ice hockey players
Anaheim Ducks announcers
Brandon Wheat Kings players
Canadian ice hockey defencemen
Colorado Avalanche players
Dallas Stars players
Florida Panthers players
Halifax Citadels players
Ice hockey people from Alberta
Kalamazoo Wings (1974–2000) players
Krefeld Pinguine players
Living people
Mighty Ducks of Anaheim players
München Barons players
New York Islanders players
Quebec Nordiques players
Saskatoon Blades players
Seattle Breakers players
Seattle Thunderbirds players
Stanley Cup champions
Utica Devils players
Winnipeg Jets (1979–1996) draft picks
People from Vegreville
Canadian expatriate ice hockey players in Germany
Vegreville Rangers players